The South Africa national rugby league team to date have competed at two Rugby League World Cups in 1995 and 2000.

Rugby league was originally introduced to South Africa in the 1950s with the staging of several series tournaments within the country that saw fixtures between the English and the French however this concept failed to generate the needed interest and was not upheld. The South Africans did not see further international rugby league until the 1960s where the first national side undertook fixtures against the visiting British and a tour to Australia. From the 1960s onwards the international fixture list for the South Africans was minimal and it was not until the early 1990s when they began to play with some lasting regularity.

Since they began playing international rugby league South Africa have always found it difficult to compete against the more established nations and so progress and improvement have been slow. Possibly their greatest achievement to date has been the qualification and participation in two World Cups in both 1995 and 2000 where South Africa failed to win a fixture after being seeded in tough groups at both tournaments where they had to play world champions Australia along with England, Fiji, France, Papua New Guinea and Tonga.

South Africa traditionally play in a predominately green uniform with black shorts, they have commonly been referred to as The Rhinos since the early 1990s. The South African emblem is a red and yellow King Protea plant which is the national flower of South Africa. South African internationals are played at a variety of venues throughout the country with no singular home ground being used.

It has often been said that South Africa has great potential for rugby league, but the sport has a relatively low profile in the country with rugby union being the predominant and more established code. This is exacerbated by the fact that very few schools offer rugby league as an extracurricular activity and there are relatively few youth clubs. The popularity of the South Africa national rugby union team and South Africa national rugby sevens team in the country further hinders the development of rugby league as potential players are groomed to play in the national and provincial Rugby union teams and the national Rugby sevens team from a young age.

History

Rugby league first gained attention in South Africa when the English and French attempted expansion in the 1950s for the purpose of creating further international opposition. Three games were then played between the two nations on the continent but both sides viewed the matches as nothing more than friendly fixtures so never undertook the games in a serious manner and the public never subsequently took to the three exhibition games. Though rugby league was only seriously played in South Africa beginning in the 1950s, the sport was not unknown to South Africans prior to that decade; for example, a number of notable black and Coloured rugby union players, such as David Barends, Green Vigo, and Enslin Dlambulo, code-switched from union to league and moved overseas, in part because of the allure of professionalism, while also escaping the apartheid regime.

Over the next several years, rugby league lay dormant in South Africa and it was not until the 1960s when talks of creating a national side began. After much discussion within South Africa, it was eventually agreed for a national side to play a touring Great Britain and then undertake a tour of Australasia. The first South African national side played their first competitive fixture on 23 August 1962 and put on a good showing against the much stronger British but eventually lost by nineteen points 49–30. The following two fixtures turned out to be much the same with the South Africans being defeated on another two occasions but putting in good performances whilst never being comprehensively beaten. The South Africans embarked on their first tour eleven months later with a twenty-four-man squad that included several former Springboks. The tour started with several friendly fixtures against various minor representative sides where they gained two comfortable victories; the first international fixture of the tour took place in Brisbane against the world champion Australians and the South Africans performed with courage but eventually lost the match 34–6. The following test was played a week later in Sydney that again saw the team put in a tough effort but lost again 54–21. South Africa left Australia without an international win and be low on confidence heading to New Zealand to play a sole fixture against the New Zealand national side whom were expected to win comfortably. However, the match turned out to be a tough encounter and surprisingly saw the team gain its first international victory 4–3 The South Africans featured several Australian players bought in to cover injuries and improve the quality of the side and so the match against New Zealand is not counted as a test match.

After this first string of international fixtures the South Africans became disheartened after only winning four of the thirteen tour matches and rugby league again lay dormant for decades.

The Rugby League World Cup tournament had been scheduled to be held in France in 1965, this time with the inclusion of the South African team. However the tournament was abandoned.

The early 1990s saw new South African administrators begin to rebuild the international facet of South African rugby. During 1992, the South African national side again played for the first time in years against several combined African representative teams and the following years saw things look more promising for the Africans with their qualification into the 1995 World Cup and more regularity in international fixtures. Their first World Cup saw the South Africans seeded into the toughest group of the competition containing Australia, England and Fiji. The South Africans found their three group matches extremely difficult and failed to win a match during the tournament.

2000- present
The following years saw the South Africans play on an inconsistent basis against several touring sides and qualify for their second consecutive World Cup in 2000. Leading into the tournament they were hopeful of gaining their first Cup win after being drawn into an easier yet still competitive group with France, Papua New Guinea and Tonga. After initial optimism leading into the competition the South Africans faced Tonga in their first world cup fixture and be comprehensively beaten 66–18. The following world cup matches added further disappointment and diminish all optimism the South Africans originally had with further heavy losses to both Papua New Guinea and the French.

After a second disappointing World Cup the side again began playing irregularly with one off fixtures over the next several years and it was not until 2006 when they again undertook another tour. A tour to Italy was undertaken in June 2006, which saw the South Africans play in two tests and a nines competition in Montelanico.

In 2008, the South Africa Rhinos were scheduled to participate in the 2008 Rugby League World Cup Qualifiers in the Atlantic pool also featuring the USA, Japan and the West Indies. The winner of the tournament entered into the repecharge round for the chance to qualify for the 2008 Rugby League World Cup. South Africa withdrew alongside the West Indies due to financial reasons, leaving the tournament as a one off fixture between the US and Japan. As a result of their withdrawal South Africa forfeited the opportunity to qualify for the World Cup.

In 2011 however, the South Africa national rugby league team participated in the Atlantic Qualification Tournament as part of the 2013 Rugby League World Cup Qualifiers. The winner of the tournament qualified for the 2013 Rugby League World Cup that is to be held in England and Wales. Despite beating Canada 36–22 in a warm-up match before the beginning of the tournament, South Africa nevertheless lost to USA 40–4 in the opening match of the tournament.

In 2015 South Africa were confirmed to take on Lebanon in a one-off 2017 Rugby League World Cup qualifier in Dubai, United Arab Emirates. However the match was shifted to a two match playoff in Pretoria, South Africa due to a controversial arrest of the leader of UAE rugby league who was in charge of organizing the initial match at the Dubai Sports City complex.

Current squad
Tyler Thomas
Darren O'Donovan
Will Smith
Byron Hutchinson
Juan Benadie
Coby Thomas
Kamren Cryer
Joel Tubbs
Hugo de Villiers
Zach van Loggerenberg
Shane Gillham
Seth Buckley
Marcelle Viljoen
Johannes Erasmus van Zyl
Jason King
Garry Bautz
Chelsea Michael Adams
Andre-Carl Joubert
Tjaart Van Der Walt
Ash Bull
Jason Cutler
Louis Musson
Bevan De Vries
Keegan Turner
Jackson Frei
Mitchell Frei
Brendan Frei 
Edward Proudler
Ayden Perry 
Jonathan Soares
Allan Kasselman 
Jean Coetzer
Robin Howell 
Stephanus Esterhuyse 
Jean-Charl Smith 
Damian Diedricks
Gideon Mzembe
Joshua Hill

Notable players

Since rugby league has been known to the nation of South Africa since the 1950s many players of South African birth or heritage have gone on to attain notability in representing either South Africa, other nations or appearing in major domestic leagues around the world, some of the more notable South Africans have included:

Record
Below is a list of test matches played by the South Africa XIII up until 18 December 2020.

Fixtures

2008

2009
SA (34) vs British defence Force (38)
SA (12) vs Australian Universities (42)
SA "A" (24) vs British community Lions (42)
SA (6) vs British community Lions (36)

2011

2015

2016

2018

2019

See also

Rugby league in South Africa
South African Rugby League
Rugby league in Africa

References

External links

 
National rugby league teams